Yves d'Alençon (died c. 1005), Seigneur de Bellême, the first known progenitor of the House of Bellême.

Life
Yves was probably the son of Yves de Creil, one of those who saved young Duke Richard I from death or mutilation at hand of King Louis IV of France. Yves de Bellême held the castle and lands of Bellême, of the King of France, as well as the Sonnois and part of the Passais, both held of the Count of Maine. That he held part of the march-lands of Passais is known from his having given abbot Gauzlin of Fleury Abbey the lands of Magny-le-Désert.

His wife was named Godeheut and although her parentage is unknown, she was the sister of Seinfroy, Bishop of Le Mans. Yves was the founder of a church dedicated to the Virgin Mary in his castle of  Bellême and endowed it with a church in the Sonoisis, another at Vieux Bellême plus a vill and three other churches in the Hiesmois. Yves died sometime after 1005.

Family
Yves de Bellême and his wife Godeheut had five children:

 William of Bellême (960/5 - 1028), succeeded his father as seigneur de Bellême.
 Yves de Bellême (d. 1030), Abbot of Fleury.
 Avesgaud de Bellême (d. 1036), Bishop of Le Mans.
 Hildeburg, abt. 1006 married Aimon, Seigneur de Chateau-du-Loir.
 Godehilde, married Hamon-aux-Dents or Hamon Le Dentu, he was the 1st Baron of Le Creully and he was Lord over Creully, Torigni, Évrecy & St. Scolasse-sur-Sarthe, but he lost all his lands, after trying to kill William the bastard, in the battle of Val-ès-Dunes, Normandy, France

Notes

References

External links
biography

1000s deaths
Year of birth unknown
Year of death uncertain

10th-century French people